Rabocerus is a genus of beetles belonging to the family Salpingidae.

The species of this genus are found in Europe.

Species:
 Rabocerus foveolatus (Ljungh, 1823) 
 Rabocerus gabrieli (Gerhardt, 1901)

References

Salpingidae